Venus Williams was the defending champion, but she chose not to compete this year.

Jennifer Capriati won the title after Lindsay Davenport retired from the final with the scoreline at 6–2, 4–0.

Seeds
The first four seeds received a bye into the second round.

Draw

Finals

Top half

Bottom half

Qualifying

Seeds

Qualifiers

Lucky losers

Draw

First qualifier

Second qualifier

Third qualifier

Fourth qualifier

Fifth qualifier

Sixth qualifier

References

External links
 Main and Qualifying Draws (WTA Archive)

Connecticut Open (tennis)
Pilot Pen Tennis - Singles